SM U-122 was a Type UE II long-range minelayer submarine of the Imperial German Navy during World War I. U-122 was engaged in naval warfare and took part in the First Battle of the Atlantic.

U-122 was surrendered to the Allies at Harwich on 26 November 1918 in accordance with the requirements of the Armistice with Germany. She was later laid up at Chatham until towed out round into the English Channel and scuttled off the Isle of Wight on 1 July 1921.

Design
German Type UE II submarines were preceded by the shorter Type UE I submarines. U-122 had a displacement of  when at the surface and  while submerged. The submarine was powered by two  engines for use while surfaced, and two  engines for use while submerged. She had two shafts and two  propellers.

U-122 was fitted with four  torpedo tubes (fitted at the bow), twelve torpedoes, two  mine chutes (fitted at the stern), forty-two mines, one  SK L/45 deck gun, and 494 rounds. She had a complement of forty (thirty-six crew members and four officers).

Summary of raiding history

References

Notes

Citations

Bibliography

German Type UE II submarines
Ships built in Hamburg
1918 ships
U-boats commissioned in 1918
World War I submarines of Germany